Politics is an academic journal belonging to the Political Studies Association established in 1981. Its current editors are Nivi Manchanda, Javier Sajuria, and James Strong, all from Queen Mary University of London.

According to the Journal Citation Reports, the journal has a 2018 impact factor of 1.656, ranking it 56th out of 169 journals in the category "Political Science".

See also 
 List of political science journals

References

External links 
 

Political science journals
Publications established in 1981
Quarterly journals
English-language journals
Academic journals associated with learned and professional societies of the United Kingdom